Eric Wight (born November 15, 1974) is an American professional artist, illustrator and animator. He is leader of the Epic Originals line at children's digital reading platform Epic.

He graduated from the School of Visual Arts and lives in Eastern Pennsylvania.

Career
Wight is the author of the manga, My Dead Girlfriend.  He illustrated the comic book adaptation of Michael Chabon's Pulitzer Prize winning novel The Amazing Adventures of Kavalier and Clay.  He was the recipient of the 2004 Russ Manning Award.

He is perhaps best known as the 'ghost artist' for television character, Seth Cohen on the former Fox TV series The OC and is the creator of 'Atomic County'. For the HBO TV show Six Feet Under he created the fake vintage comic "Blue Twister".

Wight was also an animator, working with Warner Bros. during the heyday of their animated output, working on such cartoons as Superman: The Animated Series, Batman Beyond, and others.

Works

Books
 Totally Super Squad (writer, 2020)
Frankie Pickle and the Closet of Doom (writer/illustrator, 2009)
 Frankie Pickle and the Pine Run 3000 (writer/illustrator, 2010)
 Frankie Pickle and the Mathematical Menace (writer/illustrator, 2011)
 Everyone Loves Bacon (illustrator, 2015)
Everyone Loves Cupcake (illustrator, 2016)

The Magic Shop Series
 The Vanishing Coin (April 2014)
 The Incredible Twisting Arm (April 2014)
 The Great Escape ( October 2014)
 The Disappearing Magician (June 2015)

Graphic novels
 My Dead Girlfriend
 Frankie Pickle

Comic books
 Buffy the Vampire Slayer Season Eight #20 (art supervisor)
 Justice League of America #0 & #12 (interior); #7 (cover/layouts)
 Spike vs. Dracula #1-4 (covers)
 Action Comics Annual #10 (interiors)
 The Goon #9 (interiors)
 The Legion #25 (interiors)
 JLA - Z #3 (pin-up)
 The Amazing Adventures of the Escapist #1 & #5
 Hellboy Weird Tales #2

Television
 The O.C. (ghost artist of Seth Cohen and creator of The Atomic County)
 Six Feet Under (illustrated The Blue Twister Golden Age comic book in Episode #48: "Grinding the Corn")

References

External links
 
 Profile on TOKYOPOP's website
 Eric Wight's official site
 Eric Wight Interview at Legions of Gotham

American comics artists
1974 births
Living people
American illustrators